The 1970 E3 Harelbeke was the 13th edition of the E3 Harelbeke cycle race and was held on 21 March 1970. The race started and finished in Harelbeke. The race was won by Daniel Van Ryckeghem of the Dr. Mann team.

General classification

References

1970 in Belgian sport
1970